Shepherd's Bush station is a railway station located in the district of Shepherd's Bush in Greater London, England, UK. It opened on 29 September 2008 on the West London line and is served by London Overground and Southern rail services. It lies within Travelcard Zone 2.

A number of stations in the area both past and present have borne the name Shepherd's Bush; today the National Rail station shares its name with the adjacent Central line , with which it shares a surface-level interchange.

An entirely separate London Underground station,  on the Circle line and Hammersmith & City line located approximately 500 metres (0.3 miles) away was originally called Shepherd's Bush. This station was renamed on 12 October that year to Shepherd's Bush Market to avoid confusion.

History

Previously a station existed almost on the same site as the present Shepherd's Bush station. Uxbridge Road station was opened in 1869 by London & North Western Railway and the Great Western Railway on the Middle Circle route. In 1905 the line became branch of the Metropolitan Railway, and later London Underground's Metropolitan line. Uxbridge Road was closed in 1940 after the line was bombed several times during the Blitz.

In 2005, construction began on a major redevelopment project in the White City area, including the large-scale Westfield Shopping Centre, developed by the Westfield Group. Shepherd's Bush station was designed and funded by the Westfield Group as part of a Section 106 redevelopment contribution, and construction was project-managed by Capita Symonds; this project also included the provision of an integrated bus interchange and the reconstruction of the London Underground Central line station.

Building work on the West London line station began in early 2006 and it was due to open in summer 2007. Although largely completed on time, the station was unable to open due to the northbound platform being  too narrow to comply with railway safety regulations, based on the anticipated number of passengers using the station. Following remedial reconstruction work on the platform, the station opened on 29 September 2008.

The three-letter station code SPB and location code 9587 appear on ticketing systems, and train times for the station began appearing on timetables from May 2007.

With a 2007 opening date in mind, the station was to have been served by Silverlink trains, and it was fitted out with Silverlink-branded signage. By the time the station actually opened to passenger service, the rail franchise had passed to London Overground, and the station signage was rebranded.

In April 2015 the station platforms were extended to accommodate longer, 8-car Southern trains, and a footbridge and a new entrance were constructed at the northern end of the station to ease passenger flows. The £1.35m station upgrade work was supported with £3.9 million from the Westfield Shopping Centre and the platform lengthening was part of a nine-month, £25 million project funded by Network Rail to extend platforms along the West London line.

Services

Rail services at the station are provided by Southern and London Overground.

London Overground services at this station in trains per hour are:
 4tph northbound to  via .

Southern services at this station in trains per hour are:
 1tph northbound to 

Connections
London Buses routes 31, 49, 72, 94, 95, 148, 207, 220, 228, 237, 260, 272, 283, 295, 316, 607, C1 and night routes N72 and N207 serve the station.

Gallery

See also
Shepherd's Bush railway station (L&SWR) – a closed station of the same name south of Shepherd's Bush Common on a closed London and South Western Railway branch line
Shepherd's Bush stations
Imperial Wharf railway station – another newly opened station on the West London line

References

External links

Map of London Overground
Some details on the transport aspects of the new development, including this station

Railway stations in the London Borough of Hammersmith and Fulham
Railway stations opened by Network Rail
Railway stations in Great Britain opened in 2008
Railway stations served by London Overground
Railway station
Railway stations served by Govia Thameslink Railway